Davon Jefferson (born November 3, 1986) is an American professional basketball player for Real Estelí of the Nicaraguan Liga Superior Baloncesto (LSB). He attended and played college basketball at the University of Southern California.

High school 
Jefferson prepped at Lynwood High School and went to a fifth year prep school at The Patterson School in Patterson, North Carolina. Rivals.com listed Jefferson as a five-star recruit, the 15th rated prospect of the entire 2006 class and as the No. 2 player out of California, behind Brook Lopez.

College 
He played collegiately with the University of Southern California (USC). Jefferson was all Pac-10 honorable mention and first team all-freshman.

Professional career
Jefferson entered the 2008 NBA Draft and hired an agent, thereby ending his college eligibility. However, he was not drafted. After being undrafted he signed his first professional contract with Maccabi Haifa of the Israeli League. The 2010–11 season he spent playing in France with ASVEL Basket. In July 2011 he signed a one-year contract with Triumph Lyubertsy in Russia. He was named Russian PBL MVP for the 2011–12 season. In November 2012, he signed a one-year contract with Yenisey Krasnoyarsk in Russia.

For the 2013–14 season he signed with Changwon LG Sakers of South Korea. In June 2014, he re-signed with them for one more season. In March 2015, Jefferson was kicked out of the team for unprofessional conduct and stretching during the national anthem. In August 2015, he signed with Al Shabab Dubai.

On December 30, 2015, he signed with the Russian club Krasny Oktyabr. On May 11, 2016, he signed with the Capitanes de Arecibo of Puerto Rico for the rest of the 2016 BSN season.

On August 17, 2016, Jefferson signed with the Venezuelan club Guaros de Lara. With them he won the 2016 FIBA Intercontinental Cup. On November 8, 2016, he signed with Turkish club Gaziantep Basketbol.

On July 2, 2017, Jefferson signed with Turkish club Bahçeşehir Koleji. He left Bahçeşehir after appearing in five games. On January 18, 2018, he signed with Yeşilgiresun Belediye for the rest of the 2017–18 BSL season.

On October 2, 2018, Jefferson signed a deal with Italian club Pallacanestro Cantù.

On July 29, 2019, he signed with Virtus Roma of the Italian Lega Basket Serie A (LBA).  

On November 3, 2020, he signed with Maccabi Haifa.

On June 20, 2021, Jefferson returned to Capitanes de Arecibo.

References

External links 
 Eurobasket.com profile
 RealGM profile
 USC Trojans bio
 TBLStat.net Profile

1986 births
Living people
American expatriate basketball people in China
American expatriate basketball people in France
American expatriate basketball people in Israel
American expatriate basketball people in Italy
American expatriate basketball people in Russia
American expatriate basketball people in South Korea
American expatriate basketball people in Turkey
American expatriate basketball people in the United Arab Emirates
American expatriate basketball people in Venezuela
American men's basketball players
ASVEL Basket players
Basketball players from California
BC Enisey players
BC Krasny Oktyabr players
BC Zenit Saint Petersburg players
Real Estelí Baloncesto players
Capitanes de Arecibo players
Changwon LG Sakers players
Gaziantep Basketbol players
Guaros de Lara (basketball) players
Israeli Basketball Premier League players
Lega Basket Serie A players
Maccabi Haifa B.C. players
Pallacanestro Virtus Roma players
People from Lynwood, California
Small forwards
Sportspeople from Los Angeles County, California
USC Trojans men's basketball players
Yeşilgiresun Belediye players